İttihadism was the ideology of the Committee of Union and Progress, which undertook the Young Turk Revolution in 1908 and ruled the Ottoman Empire from 1913 to 1918.

Turkish Nationalism 

Though the Central Committee of the CUP was made up of intense Turkish nationalists, until the defeat in the First Balkan War in 1912–13, the CUP did not stress its Turkish nationalism in public as it would offend the non-Turkish population of the empire. A further problem for Union and Progress was that the majority of the ethnic Turks of the empire did not see themselves as Turks at all, but rather simply as Sunni Muslims who happened to speak Turkish. The Turkish historian Taner Akçam wrote that at the time of the First World War that "It is even questionable whether the broad mass of Muslims in Anatolia at the time understood themselves as Turks, or Kurds, rather than as Muslims". Though the CUP was dedicated to a revolutionary transformation of Ottoman society by its "science-conscious cadres", the CUP were conservative revolutionaries who wished to retain the monarchy and Islam's status as the state religion as the Young Turks believed that the sultanate and Islam were an essential part of the glue holding the Ottoman Empire together.

Cult of Science 

The Unionists believed that the secret behind the success of the west was science, and that the more scientifically advanced a nation was, the more powerful it was. According to the Turkish historian Handan Nezir Akmeşe, the essence of the Union and Progress was the "cult of science" and a strong sense of Turkish nationalism. Strongly influenced by French intellectuals such as Auguste Comte and Gustave Le Bon, the Unionists had embraced the idea of rule by a scientific elite. For the Young Turks, the basic problem of the Ottoman Empire was its backward, impoverished status and the fact that most of its Muslim population were illiterate; thus, most Ottoman Muslims could not learn about modern science even if they had wanted to. The CUP had an obsession with science, above all the natural sciences (CUP journals devoted much text to chemistry lessons), and the Unionists often described themselves as "societal doctors" who would apply modern scientific ideas and methods to solve all social problems. The CUP saw themselves as a scientific elite, whose superior knowledge would save the empire; one Unionist later recalled the atmosphere as: "Being a Unionist was almost a type of God-given privilege".

For purposes of enlisting public support from a Turkish public that was for the most part devoutly Muslim (the Koran says all Muslims are equal in the eyes of Allah, so the theory of a superior "Turkish race" might seem blasphemous), and out of the fear of alienating those Ottoman Muslims who were not Turks like the Arabs, the Albanians and the Kurds, the CUP's pseudo-scientific theories about the "Turkish race" were usually not publicly proclaimed.

Social Darwinism 

In the words of the sociologist Ziya Gökalp, the CUP's chief thinker, the German racial approach to defining a nation was the "one that happened to more closely match the condition of ‘Turkishness’, which was struggling to constitute its own historical and national identity". The French racist Arthur de Gobineau whose theories had such a profound impact upon the German  thinkers in the 19th century was also a major influence upon the CUP. The Turkish historian Taner Akçam wrote that the CUP were quite flexible about mixing pan-Islamic, pan-Turkic, and Ottomanist ideas as it suited their purposes, and the Unionists at various times would emphasise one at the expense of the others depending upon the exigencies of the situation. All that mattered in the end to the CUP was that the Ottoman Empire become great again, and that the Turks be the dominant group within the empire.

The Young Turks had embraced Social Darwinism and pseudo-scientific biological racism as the basis of their philosophy with history being seen as a merciless racial struggle with only the strongest "races" surviving. For the CUP, the Japanese government had ensured that the "Japanese race" were strongest in east Asia, and it was their duty to ensure that the "Turkish race" become the strongest in the near east. For the CUP, just as it was right and natural for the superior "Japanese race" to dominate "inferior races" like the Koreans and the Chinese, likewise it would be natural for the superior "Turkish race" to dominate "inferior races" like Greeks and Armenians. This Social Darwinist perspective explains how the Unionists were so ferocious in their criticism of Western imperialism (especially if directed against the Ottoman Empire) while being so supportive of Japanese imperialism in Korea and China. When Japan annexed Korea in 1910, the Young Turks supported this move under the Social Darwinist grounds that the Koreans were a weak people who deserved to be taken over by the stronger Japanese both for their own good and the good of the Japanese empire. Along the same lines, the Social Darwinism of the Unionists led them to see the Armenian and Greek minorities, who tended to be much better educated, literate and wealthier than the Turks and who dominated the business life of the empire, as a threat to their plans for a glorious future for the "Turkish race".

Islamism 
During the reign of Sultan Abdul Hamid II, Pan-Islamism had become an important part of the state ideology as Abdul Hamid had often stressed his claim to be the Caliph. The claim that Abdul Hamid was the Caliph, making him the political and spiritual leader of all Muslims not only caught on within the Ottoman Empire, but throughout the entire Dar-al-Islam (the "House of Islam", i.e. the Islamic world), especially in British controlled India. The fact that Indian Muslims seemed to have far more enthusiasm for the Ottoman Sultan-Caliph than they did for the British King-Emperor was a matter of considerable concern for British decision-makers. The fear that the Sultan-Caliph might declare jihad against the British, and thereby plunge India into a revolt by its Muslims was a constant factor in British policy towards the Ottoman Empire. The CUP endorsed Abdul Hamid's legacy upon his death in February 1918, even though the CUP launched a revolution against Abdul Hamid in 1908 and ultimately deposed him in 1909. Şükrü Hanioğlu asserts that the CUP generally appealed to Islam simply when ever it was convenient. For the CUP, keeping the Sultanate-Caliphate in being had the effect of not only reinforcing the loyalty of Ottoman Muslims to the empire, but was also a useful foreign policy tool. As in 1909 Crete decided to leave the Ottoman Empire and join Greece instead, the CUP warned the European powers to support such an endeavor as it would lead to a strong opposition from the Muslim communities worldwide. Similarly, the CUP sent a delegation to the annual Hajj pilgrimage to Mecca in 1909 to raise support for their opposition to the European aggression. To forge further support to an eventual Pan-Islamic alliance, the CUP supported the creation of the Islamic association Ittihad ol Islam in Iran in 1910 and managed to establish Pan-Islamist ties in Iraq despite the Shiite-Sunni divide.

Modernisation and secularism 
While the CUP eventually relied on Pan-Islamism, there always existed a secular culture within the Sacred Committee. The CUP heavily cracked down on religious fanaticism following the 31 March Incident which strained its relationship with the ulema, but at the same time used Islamist ferver for their benefit during World War I. Nevertheless, the CUP saw itself as a modernizing force for bringing Ottoman, Turkish, and Muslim society to European standards, which mandated social reform. An example of pre-Kemalist style social reform was the controversial "Temporal Family Law" passed in 1917 was a significant advance in women's rights and secularism in Ottoman matrimonial law. Women's right to divorce was expanded, while polygamy was restricted.

Influence of Goltz 

The primary influences on the Unionists were the French scientist Gustave Le Bon and the German General Baron Colmar von der Goltz. Le Bon argued that democracy was only just mindless mob rule and the best form of the government was a rule by a scientific elite.

Equally important given the large number of army officers as Unionists was the influence of Goltz, who trained an entire generation of Ottoman officers, the so-called "Goltz generation". Goltz was a militarist, Social Darwinist and an ultra-nationalist who saw war as something necessary, desirable and inevitable, writing: "It [war] is an expression of the energy and self-respect which a nation possesses... Perpetual peace means perpetual death!". Goltz's most important idea, which was to greatly influence the Unionists was that of the "nation in arms", that henceforward in modern war, the side that could mobilise best the entire resources of its society would be the one that would win, and as such the best thing that could done was to militarise one's society in peacetime to ensure that it would be a "nation in arms" when the inevitable war came. Goltz, who spoke fluent Turkish and was very popular with the officers he had trained expressed a great deal of admiration for the Turks as a naturally warlike people, in contrast to his country where he believed that hedonism was rendering the next generation of young German men unfit for war.

Goltz was also an intense Anglophobe who believed that the great struggle of the coming 20th century would be a world war between Britain and Germany for the mastery of the world; for him it was self-evident that the world was just too small for the British and German empires to co-exist, and he urged his protégés in the Ottoman Army to ensure that the empire fought on the side of his country when the inevitable Anglo-German war broke out.

Japanophilia 

As great as the influence of Goltz and Le Bon were on the Unionists, the primary example for them was Japan. Germany was the role model for the technical and organisational aspects of modernisation while Japan was the overall societal model. Already within the early years of the 20th century, the Japanese had started to champion the ideology of Pan-Asianism, under which all of the Asian peoples were to united under the leadership of Japan, the strongest of the Asian nations and as the "great Yamato race", the most racially superior of the Asian peoples as a justification for their imperialism. The CUP were greatly influenced by Japanese Pan-Asianism, which served as a template for their ideology of Pan-Islamism, where all of the world's Muslims were to united in the Ottoman Empire, led of course by the "Turkish race". An American historian, Sven Saaler, noted the "important connections" between the Japanese pan-Asian and the Ottoman pan-Islamist movements in the early 20th century as well as the "astonishing parallels" between the two movements. The ultimate aim of the CUP was to modernise the Ottoman Empire to recapture its former greatness, and just as the modernised Meiji Japan had defeated Russia in 1905, so too would the modernised Ottoman state defeat the western nations.

The CUP, which always greatly admired Japan for modernising itself after the so-called Meiji Restoration of 1867–68, were much impressed by Japan's victory over Russia in the Russo-Japanese War. The Young Turks were especially impressed with the way the Japanese had been able to embrace western science and technology without losing their "Eastern spiritual essence", an example that was especially inspiring to them because many in the Ottoman Empire believed that the embrace of western science and technology were diametrically opposed to Islam. The fact that an Asian nation like Japan had defeated Russia in 1905, the traditional enemy of the Ottoman Empire was very inspiring to the Unionists, and Unionist newspapers all portrayed Japan's victory as a triumph not only over Russia, but also over western values. To the CUP, for whom science was something of a religion, the Japanese example seemed to show how the Ottoman Empire could embrace the science of the west without losing its Islamic identity.

Reflecting this intense Japanophilia, the new regime proclaimed its intention to remake the Ottoman Empire into the "Japan of the Near East". In their own minds, the Central Committee of the CUP saw themselves as playing a role analogous to that of the oligarchy of Meiji Japan, and the revolution of 1908 as an event comparable to the brief civil war that had toppled the Tokugawa shogunate in 1867–68. One Unionist Colonel Pertev Bey wrote after the revolution of 1908: "We will rise shortly... with the same brilliance as the Rising Sun of the Far East did a few years ago! In any case, let us not forget that a nation always rises from its own strength!"In an inversion of western paranoia about the "Yellow Peril", the CUP often fantasised about creating an alliance with Japan that would unite all the peoples of "the East" to wage war against and wipe out the much hated western nations that dominated the world, a "Yellow wave" that would wash away European civilisation for good. For them, the term yellow (which was in fact a derogatory western term for east Asians, based upon their perceived skin colour) stood for the "Eastern gold", the innate moral superiority of eastern peoples over the corrupt west. In the eyes of the Unionists, it was the civilisations of the middle east, the Indian subcontinent, and the far east that were the superior civilisations to western civilisation, and it was merely an unfortunate accident of history that the west had happened to become more economically and technologically advanced than the Asian civilisations, something that they were determined to correct.

An additional attraction for Japan as a role model for the Unionists was that the Japanese had modernised while keeping their women in an extremely subservient position within their society; the all-male Young Turks did not wish for Ottoman women to become anything like the women of the west, and instead wanted to preserve the traditional roles for women.

Nation in arms 
Influenced by Goltz's "nation in arms" theory, the Unionists held that in war the moral state of the nation was just as important as such aspects as technology and the level of training.

The Japanese held fast to their traditional values of bushido ("the way of the warrior"), and had an educational system designed to indoctrinate every Japanese young man with the belief that there was no higher duty than to die for the emperor and every Japanese young woman there was no higher duty than to bear sons who would die for the emperor. The Unionists were much impressed with how the Japanese had fought at the siege of Port Arthur (modern Lüshun, China) where the Japanese infantry advanced on the Russian trenches, only to be mown down time after time by the Russian machine guns, suffering thousands of dead in each assault, yet the Japanese soldiers, full of their belief in bushido, were honoured to die for their Emperor. As such, the Japanese kept on assaulting the Russian lines at Port Arthur, despite their enormous losses. The Japanese soldiers indoctrinated since their earliest days into Japanese ultra-nationalism and bushido had fought fanatically for their nation, an example the CUP was keen to emulate. By contrast, the Unionists noted how the Russian soldiers had no idea of what they were fighting for in Manchuria or why their country was at war with Japan, and with nothing to believe in, clung only to their lives and fought poorly as they had no wish to die for a cause that was unfathomable to them. Many Unionist officers took the "lesson" of Port Arthur as being that an army that was fanatically motivated enough would always win; the power of a properly dug defence, even one manned by such poorly motivated soldiers such as the Russians at Port Arthur to inflict terrible casualties on an attacking force made less of an impression on them.

A major factor in Unionist thinking was the "devaluation of life", the belief that eastern peoples like the Japanese and the Turks attached no value to human life including their own, and unlike the westerners who allegedly clung pathetically to their lives when confronted with danger, easterners supposedly died willingly and happily for the cause. The Unionists intended to emulate the Japanese example by creating a militaristic educational system designed to make every man a soldier and every woman into essentially a soldier-making machine; the concept of jihad would play the same role in motivating the Turkish soldier to fight and die for the caliph (regarded as Allah's representative on the Earth) as bushido did for the Japanese soldier to die for his emperor (regarded by the Japanese as a living god). Ultimately for the Unionists, war was a test of wills, and the side that had the stronger will and hence lesser fear of death would always prevail, and as an eastern people who supposedly cared nothing for the value of human life, the Unionists believed that the Turks had an innate advantage over the decadent west. It was accepted by the Unionists that provided that an eastern army had the same level of training and technology as a western army, the eastern army had the advantage because of their greater will to win. It was believed by the Unionists that the combination of German training and weapons together with the greater willingness to die motivated by their own superior Islamic and Turkish traditions would make the Ottoman military invincible in war. Past Ottoman victories over western nations like those over the Serbs at Kosovo in 1389, which ended Serbia as an independent kingdom; over the French, Hungarian, German and other Christian knights at Nicopolis in 1396, which crushed the crusade proclaimed by Pope Boniface IX; the fall of Constantinople in 1453 which ended the eastern Roman Empire; and the Battle of Mohacs in 1526 which led to conquest of Hungary were used by the Unionists to argue that the Turks were naturally the greatest soldiers in the world and were much superior to western soldiers. As it were, the Turks had in the viewpoint of the Unionists become lazy since those glorious days, and what the Turks needed now was a series of reforms to allow the Turkish society to become the "nation in arms".

National Economy 

Before the revolution, the CUP held extremist views of the economy, for example advocating for boycotts against Armenian goods and shutting down the Public Debt Administration. Post revolutionary success gave way to a pragmatic economic policy. Other than encouragement of domestic production projects, the CUP largely followed a free trade policy to Cavid's designs, resulting in a large increase in foreign investment between 1908 and 1913 despite the volatility of the Ottoman Empire's international standing.

However following the radicalization of the CUP post-Balkan Wars, the committee switched back to extremist rhetoric in the economy, advocating for Muslim Turkish domination of the economy at the expense of non-Muslim and non-domestic business. National Economy, "Millî İktisat", was a combination of corporatism, protectionism, and statist economic policies. This became a formal platform of CUP policy in their 1916 Congress in Selanik, whose goal was to create an indigenous Turkish-Muslim bourgeoisie and middle class. For the CUP, the way to kick start capitalism for the Turks was to seize capital from the well endowed Christians for themselves. To this end, pseudo-Marxist rhetoric was used against Armenian enterprise such as there being a "class struggle" and disproportionate ownership by Armenians of wealth that had to be shared with Muslims at all costs. Import substitution industrialization and property confiscation centralized of economic capital in the hands of "loyal" ethnic groups, which deepened political support for the CUP. When it came to foreign trade, previously well established free trade policy gave way to protectionism: tariffs were increased in 1914 from 8 to 11%, by 1915 they reached 30%.

The policies associated with National Economy were essential for the CUP's Türk Yurdu project that carried over to the later Republican People's Party regime, and created a fertile ground for the Republic of Turkey's industrialization post independence war.

Democracy 
In the words of the Turkish historian Handan Nezir Akmeşe, the commitment of the Unionists to the 1876 constitution that they professed to be fighting for was only "skin deep", and was more of a rallying cry for popular support than anything else.

Anti-Communism 
Realizing that the Young Turks did not fulfill their pre-1908 promises, workers from different nationalities organized strikes from Thrace to all over Western Anatolia. In the same time period, groups such as the Socialist Workers' Federation and the Ottoman Socialist Party emerged. The Young Turks, who were afraid of this international solidarity and revolutionism of the workers, enacted the Tatil-i Eşgaal Kanunu. Later, during the late Ottoman genocides, they exiled communist intellectuals along with minorities.

References

Sources
 
 
 

 
 

Committee of Union and Progress
State ideologies
Turkish nationalism
Anti-communism